Laga'aia Tiaituau Tufuga (born ~1955) is a Samoan politician and Member of the Legislative Assembly of Samoa. He is a member of the FAST Party.

Laga'aia is from the village of Fa'ala in the Palauli district. He worked as a farmer before entering politics. He was first elected to the Legislative Assembly of Samoa in the 2021 Samoan general election. On 28 July 2021 he was appointed Associate Minister of Public Enterprises.

References

Living people
Members of the Legislative Assembly of Samoa
Faʻatuatua i le Atua Samoa ua Tasi politicians
People from Palauli
Year of birth missing (living people)